The 2022–23 Fairleigh Dickinson Knights men's basketball team represents Fairleigh Dickinson University in the 2022–23 NCAA Division I men's basketball season. The Knights, led by first-year head coach Tobin Anderson, played their home games at the Rothman Center in Hackensack, New Jersey as members of the Northeast Conference. They finished the regular season 17–14, 10–6 in NEC play to finish in a tie for second place. As the No. 2 seed in the NEC Tournament, they defeated St. Francis Brooklyn and Saint Francis (PA) to advance to the championship game against Merrimack. Because Merrimack is in a transition period from Division II to Division I, the Knights earned lucky loser status by receiving the conference's automatic bid to the NCAA Tournament, despite losing the conference championship game to Merrimack 66–67. In the first round of the NCAA tournament, Fairleigh Dickinson became only the second 16 seed (and the first play-in 16 seed) to upset a 1 seed in the history of the tournament when they defeated third-ranked Purdue 63–58.

Previous season
The Knights finished the 2021–22 season 4–22, 5–13 in NEC play to finish tied for last place. As the No. 8 seed, they were defeated by Central Connecticut in the first round of the NEC tournament.

On April 25, the school announced that they would be parting ways with head coach Greg Herenda after 9 years at the position. On May 2, Tobin Anderson, head coach at St. Thomas Aquinas, was named as the Knights' next head coach.

Roster

Schedule and results

|-
!colspan=12 style=| Regular season

|-
!colspan=9 style=| NEC Tournament

 
|-
!colspan=9 style=| NCAA Tournament

Sources

References

Fairleigh Dickinson Knights men's basketball seasons
Fairleigh Dickinson Knights
Fairleigh Dickinson Knights men's basketball
Fairleigh Dickinson Knights men's basketball
Fairleigh Dickinson